The women's high jump event at the 2007 World Championships in Athletics took place on August 31, 2007 (qualification) and 2 September 2007 (final) at the Nagai Stadium in Osaka, Japan.

Medallists

Records

Results

Qualification
Qualification: 1.94 m (Q) or best 12 performances (q)

Final

References
Official results, qualification - IAAF.org
Official results, final - IAAF.org
Event report - IAAF.org

High jump
High jump at the World Athletics Championships
2007 in women's athletics